The Volpi Cup for Best Actress is an award presented by the Venice Film Festival. It is given by the festival jury in honor of an actress who has delivered an outstanding performance from the films in the competition slate. It is named in honor of Count Giuseppe Volpi di Misurata, the founder of the festival. The 1st ceremony was held in 1932, when Helen Hayes received the Volpi Cup for the title role in The Sin of Madelon Claudet (1931)—this was the only time that the award was chosen by public voting. From 1942 to 1945, the festival was suspended because of World War II. The student protests in May 1968 opened a period of institutional changes, with no prizes were awarded from 1969 to 1979.

The official name of the award has changed several times. In 1934, Katharine Hepburn was honored with the Great Gold Medal of the National Fascist Association for Entertainment for the Best Actress for her role in Little Women. It was renamed the Volpi Cup for Best Actress the following year. The awards given from 1947 to 1949 were named the International Award for the Best Actress. The Best Actress Award resumed in 1983, when Darling Légitimus became the first black woman to receive the award for her work Sugar Cane Alley. In 1992, Ingrid Bergman was honored posthumously for her performance in Europe '51, which was denied by the jury in 1952 because her voice was dubbed from Swedish into Italian. The award can be for lead or supporting roles with the exception of the period, when the additional award for Best Supporting Actress was given from 1993 to 1995. At the age of four, Victoire Thivisol became the youngest recipient for the title role in Ponette in 1996.

Since its inception, the award has been given to 67 actresses. Only four of them have won more than once: Shirley MacLaine, Isabelle Huppert, Valeria Golino and Cate Blanchett, who have each won the cup twice. Bette Davis is the only actress to win the award for her roles in two different films on the same competition; she won in 1937 for her contribution in Marked Woman and Kid Galahad. In 1988, the award was shared by two actresses in different films: Huppert in Story of Women and MacLaine in Madame Sousatzka. There have been two films, She's Been Away in 1989 and La Cérémonie in 1995, that garnered multiple winners in one year. , Cate Blanchett is the most recent winner in this category for her portrayal of Lydia Tár in Tár.

Winners

Multiple winners

The following individuals have received multiple Best Actress awards:

See also 
The following individuals have also received Best Actress award(s) at Cannes or Berlin Film Festival.

Notes

References

External links
 Volpi Cup winners since 1935 at Venice Biennale

Venice Film Festival
 
Awards for actresses
Film awards for lead actress
Film awards for supporting actress
Italian film awards